Vokil Point (‘Nos Vokil’ \'nos vo-'kil\) is a point on the southwest coast of Snow Island in the South Shetland Islands, Antarctica projecting 300 m into Boyd Strait and forming the north side of the entrance to Barutin Cove.

The feature is named after the Bulgarian ruling dynasty of Vokil (8th century).

Location

Map
 L.L. Ivanov. Antarctica: Livingston Island and Greenwich, Robert, Snow and Smith Islands. Scale 1:120000 topographic map.  Troyan: Manfred Wörner Foundation, 2009.

References
 Vokil Point. SCAR Composite Gazetteer of Antarctica.
 Bulgarian Antarctic Gazetteer. Antarctic Place-names Commission. (details in Bulgarian, basic data in English)

External links
 Vokil Point. Copernix satellite image

Headlands of the South Shetland Islands
Bulgaria and the Antarctic